Ian Kelly, (born Ian Couture-Kelly, March 30, 1979,  Montreal, Quebec, Canada) is a Canadian singer-songwriter. He has released several full-length albums.

Career 
His first album, Insecurity, was self-produced and released in 2005. His second, Speak Your Mind, was released in 2008 by Quebec indie label, Audiogram. The album sold over 45,000 copies in Canada since its release  and was certified Gold in Canada by the CRIA in March 2011. His third album, Diamonds & Plastic, was released in May 2011 and  sold over 15,000 copies in Canada. Ian toured over 75 dates in support of Diamonds & Plastic in 2011-2012, including festivals in Canada, Belgium, and France. All These Lines, Ian Kelly's fourth album, was released in Canadian stores on November 5, 2013.

Ian Kelly was nominated for two Felix awards at Gala de l'ADISQ in 2009, 2012, and 2014. One was for best non-francophone artist, the other for Anglophone Album of the Year. In 2014, Kelly was nominated for two Felix awards at Gala de l'ADISQ for Best Non-Francophone Show, and Anglophone Album of the Year.

Discography 
 Insecurity (2005)
 Speak Your Mind (September 2, 2008) (CRIA certified Gold - March 2011)
 Diamonds & Plastic (May, 2011)
 All these lines (2013)
 Christmas Day (2014) 
 Ian Kelly Live/ All These Lines Tour (2015)
 Superfolk (2016)
 Innocent (2017)
 Long Story Short (2019)

References

External links
 Official website

1979 births
Living people
Anglophone Quebec people
Canadian male singer-songwriters
Canadian singer-songwriters
Singers from Montreal
Audiogram (label) artists
Songwriters from Quebec
21st-century Canadian male singers